Kœur-la-Petite is a commune in the Meuse department in Grand Est in north-eastern France.

In 1463, during the Wars of the Roses, Kœur became a refuge for members of the defeated House of Lancaster. Henry VI of England's wife, Margaret of Anjou found shelter and lived there with her son Edward of Westminster, Prince of Wales, and John Fortescue.

Notable people
Jean-Joseph Tranchot (1752 – 1815): French military cartographer

See also
Communes of the Meuse department

References

Koeurlapetite